USS Stratford (AK-45/AP-41) was a Stratford-class transport commissioned by the U.S. Navy for service in World War II. She was responsible for delivering military personnel and equipment to ships and stations in the war zone.

Stratford (AP-41), ex-SS Catherine, was built in 1918 by the Manitowoc Shipbuilding Company of Manitowoc, Wisconsin; acquired by the Navy on 31 July 1941; and commissioned on 25 August 1941 at Baltimore, Maryland.

World War II service

After completing her shakedown in the Chesapeake Bay area, Stratford sailed from Norfolk, Virginia, on 23 October, for Iceland, via New York City and Nova Scotia. She arrived at Reykjavík on 16 November 1941 and operated there until 25 March 1942 when she returned to Boston, Massachusetts. The transport made another cruise to Iceland and returned to Boston, Massachusetts, on 27 June. She was ordered to proceed to California, via Norfolk, Key West, Florida, Guantánamo Bay, and the Panama Canal Zone.

Stratford arrived at San Pedro, California, on 28 August; loaded passengers; and sailed for Hawaii three days later. She arrived there on the 11th and sailed the following week for Samoa. The transport remained in the South Pacific until April 1945. She shuttled troops and cargo from rear areas to advance bases and; as the Americans penetrated further into the Pacific, her ports of call increased. In addition to ports in New Zealand and New Caledonia, Stratford also operated in the Solomon, Treasury, St. Matthias, New Hebrides, Russell, and Treasury Islands as well as ports in New Guinea.

Stratford arrived at Leyte on 2 April 1945 and operated in the Philippine Islands until 1 December when she sailed for the United States, via Eniwetok and Pearl Harbor.

Decommission

The transport arrived at San Pedro, California, in January 1946 and remained there until sailing for the east coast on 7 March. Stratford reached Norfolk, Virginia, on 7 March and reported to the 5th Naval District for disposition. She departed there on 3 April and headed for Baltimore, Maryland, where she had originally entered naval service. Stratford was decommissioned there on 17 April and returned to the War Shipping Administration on the same day. She was struck from the Navy list on 1 May 1946.

Military awards and honors 

Stratford received one battle star for World War II service.

Her crew was eligible for the following medals:
 American Defense Service Medal (with Fleet clasp)
 American Campaign Medal
 European-African-Middle Eastern Campaign Medal
 Asiatic-Pacific Campaign Medal (1)
 World War II Victory Medal
 Philippines Liberation Medal

See also
 sister ship
 sister ship

References 

The December 1988 issue of Proceedings, published by the US Naval Institute, contains a three-page story about the USS Stratfords mishaps and adventures en route to Iceland. "The Wackiest Ship," by Otho C. Lindsey.

External links 
 NavSource Online: Service Ship Photo Archive - AK-45 / AP-41 Stratford

Ships built in Manitowoc, Wisconsin
1918 ships
Stratford-class transports
Standard World War I ships
Steamships of the United States
World War II auxiliary ships of the United States